Jabar or West Java is a province of Indonesia.

Jabar may also refer to:
 Jabar, Iran, a village
 Jabar, Tordher, a village in Pakistan
 Jabar (union council), a union council in Pakistan
 Jabăr, a village in Boldur, Romania